The Elephant Gambit (also called the Queen's Pawn Countergambit or Englund Counterattack) is a rarely played chess opening beginning with the moves:

1. e4 e5
2. Nf3 d5

Although the Elephant Gambit is considered unsound, it has been used frequently by the Barbadian master Philip Corbin.

Lines
White is able to capture either of Black's center pawns with the advantage, either by 3.exd5 or 3.Nxe5. With a center pawn removed, Black is in a passive position with White clearly having the initiative as White controls more .

3.exd5
Black's responses to 3.exd5 include 3...e4 and 3...Bd6 (the Elephant Gambit proper). 3...Qxd5 saves the pawn, but leaves White with a big lead in  after 4.Nc3.

3...e4
After 3...e4 4.Qe2 Nf6 lines might continue: 
 5.d3 Qxd5 6.Nbd2 Be7 7.dxe4 Qe6 and White remains a pawn ahead, although Black's development is somewhat smoother.
 5.d3 Be7 6.dxe4 0-0 7.Nc3 Re8 8.Bd2 Bb4 9.0-0-0, with advantage for White (Nick de Firmian).
 5.Nc3 Be7 6.Nxe4:
 6...Nxd5 7.d3 0-0 8.Qd1 Bg4 9.Be2 f5 10.Ng3 Nc6 11.c3 with slight advantage for White, as in Salomonsson–H. Sorenson, Malmo 1982 (de Firmian).
 6...0-0 7.Nxf6+ Bxf6 8.d4 Re8 9.Be3 with distinct superiority for White (de Firmian).

After 3...e4 4.Qe2, Tal–Lutikov, Tallinn 1964 continued 4...f5 5.d3 Nf6 6.dxe4 fxe4 7.Nc3 Bb4 8.Qb5+ c6 9.Qxb4 exf3 with 10.Bg5 cxd5 11.0-0-0 Nc6 with advantage for White.

Elephant Gambit proper: 3...Bd6 

After 3...Bd6 4.d4 e4 5.Ne5 Nf6 6.Nc3 0-0 7.Bc4, according to de Firmian, White enjoys a distinct superiority but no immediate attack.

3.Nxe5
After 3.Nxe5:
 Black plays 3...Bd6 4.d4 dxe4 5.Bc4 Bxe5 6.Qh5 Qf6 7.dxe5, which is thought to be slightly better for White.
 In Lob–Eliskases, German CC 1929, Black played 3...dxe4. The game continued 4.Bc4 Qg5 5.Bxf7+ Ke7 6.d4 Qxg2 7.Rf1 Bh3 8.Bc4 Nf6 9.Bf4 and White went on to win.
 3...Qe7 leads to an advantage for White after 4.d4 f6 5.Nd3 dxe4 6.Nf4 Qf7 7.Nd2 (Bondarevsky–Lilienthal, USSR 1941).

See also
 List of chess openings

References

Bibliography
Burgess, Graham. The Mammoth Book of Chess. London: Constable and Robinson, 2000.

External links

 The Kibitzer: "We're Going On An Elephant Hunt" by Tim Harding (August 1997) at ChessCafe.com 

Chess openings